Ballinteer St John's (Irish: Naomh Eoin Bhaile an tSaoir) is a Gaelic Athletic Association club based in Ballinteer, Dún Laoghaire–Rathdown, Ireland.   Gaelic football and hurling are played.

History
The clubhouse is situated beside Marlay Park just off the Ballinteer bypass and junction 13 on the M50. It was founded in May 1982. Initially the chosen name was Ballinteer Gaels though the name was later changed to Ballinteer St Johns. The club's crest is made up of Three Castles (Dublin crest), The Eagle (Emblem of St John the Evangelist) and the Celtic Cross (GAA emblem).  A large clubhouse, Áras Naomh Eoin, was opened in 2003.

In December 2020, former Laois inter-county footballer Seán Dempsey was named as manager of the club's team competing in the Dublin Senior Football Championship.

Honours
 Dublin Senior B Hurling Championship: (1) 2010
 Dublin Intermediate Football Championship: (1) 1998
 Dublin Junior C Football Championship (3) 2007, 2008, 2015
 Dublin Junior Hurling Championship: (1) 2003
 Dublin Junior C Hurling Championship (1) 2009
 Dublin Junior D Hurling Championship (1) 2008
 Dublin Junior F Hurling Championship (1) 2014

 Dublin Under 21 A Football Championship: (1) 2022

 Dublin Under 21 B Football Championship: (2) 2012, 2021
 Dublin Under 21 C Football Championship: (1) 2008
 Dublin AFL Division 2 (1) 2002
 Dublin AFL Div. 7 Winners 2002
 Dublin AFL Div. 8 Winners 2012
 Dublin Minor B Hurling Championship Winners(2) 2018,2021
 Dublin Minor B Football Championship Winners 2012

References

External links

1982 establishments in Ireland
Gaelic football clubs in Dún Laoghaire–Rathdown
Gaelic games clubs in Dún Laoghaire–Rathdown